The following outline is provided as an overview of and topical guide to Guinea-Bissau:

Guinea-Bissau – country located in West Africa.  Guinea-Bissau is the 8th least extensive country in continental Africa.  It is bordered by Senegal to the north, and Guinea to the south and east, with the Atlantic Ocean to its west. Formerly the Portuguese colony of Portuguese Guinea,  upon independence, the name of its capital, Bissau, was added to the country's name in order to prevent confusion between itself and the Republic of Guinea.

General reference

 Pronunciation: 
 Common English country name:  Guinea-Bissau
 Official English country name:  The Republic of Guinea-Bissau
 Common endonym(s):  
 Official endonym(s):  
 Adjectival(s): Guinean
 Demonym(s): Bissau-Guinean(s)
 ISO country codes: GW, GNB, 624
 ISO region codes: See ISO 3166-2:GW
 Internet country code top-level domain: .gw

Geography of Guinea-Bissau

Geography of Guinea-Bissau
 Guinea-Bissau is: a country
 Population of Guinea-Bissau: 1,695,000  - 147th most populous country
 Area of Guinea-Bissau: 36544 km2
 Atlas of Guinea-Bissau

Location

 Guinea-Bissau is situated within the following regions:
 Northern Hemisphere and Western Hemisphere
 Africa
 West Africa
 Time zone:  Coordinated Universal Time UTC+00
 Extreme points of Guinea-Bissau
 High:  unnamed location in the northeast corner of the country 
 Low:  North Atlantic Ocean 0 m
 Land boundaries:  724 km
 386 km
 338 km
 Coastline:  North Atlantic Ocean 350 km

Environment of Guinea-Bissau

 Climate of Guinea-Bissau
 Ecoregions in Guinea-Bissau
 Protected areas of Guinea-Bissau
 Wildlife of Guinea-Bissau
 Fauna of Guinea-Bissau
 Birds of Guinea-Bissau
 Mammals of Guinea-Bissau

Natural geographic features of Guinea-Bissau

Landforms of Guinea-Bissau
 Glaciers in Guinea-Bissau: none 
 Rivers of Guinea-Bissau
 World Heritage Sites in Guinea-Bissau: None

Regions of Guinea-Bissau

Ecoregions of Guinea-Bissau
 List of ecoregions in Guinea-Bissau

Administrative divisions of Guinea-Bissau

Administrative divisions of Guinea-Bissau
 Regions of Guinea-Bissau
 Sectors of Guinea-Bissau

Regions of Guinea-Bissau

Regions of Guinea-Bissau

Sectors of Guinea-Bissau

Sectors of Guinea-Bissau

Municipalities of Guinea-Bissau
 Capital of Guinea-Bissau: Bissau
 Cities of Guinea-Bissau

Demography of Guinea-Bissau

Demographics of Guinea-Bissau

Government and politics of Guinea-Bissau

 Form of government: semi-presidential representative democratic republic
 Capital of Guinea-Bissau: Bissau
 Elections in Guinea-Bissau
 Political parties in Guinea-Bissau

Branches of the government of Guinea-Bissau

Government of Guinea-Bissau

Executive branch of the government of Guinea-Bissau
 Head of state: President of Guinea-Bissau, Malam Bacai Sanhá
 Head of government: Prime Minister of Guinea-Bissau, Carlos Gomes Júnior

Legislative branch of the government of Guinea-Bissau
 Parliament of Guinea-Bissau (unicameral)

Judicial branch of the government of Guinea-Bissau

Foreign relations of Guinea-Bissau

Foreign relations of Guinea-Bissau
 Diplomatic missions in Guinea-Bissau
 Diplomatic missions of Guinea-Bissau

International organization membership

The Republic of Guinea-Bissau is a member of:

African, Caribbean, and Pacific Group of States (ACP)
African Development Bank Group (AfDB)
African Union (AU)
Comunidade dos Países de Língua Portuguesa (CPLP)
Conference des Ministres des Finances des Pays de la Zone Franc (FZ)
Economic Community of West African States (ECOWAS)
Food and Agriculture Organization (FAO)
Group of 77 (G77)
International Bank for Reconstruction and Development (IBRD)
International Civil Aviation Organization (ICAO)
International Criminal Court (ICCt) (signatory)
International Criminal Police Organization (Interpol)
International Development Association (IDA)
International Federation of Red Cross and Red Crescent Societies (IFRCS)
International Finance Corporation (IFC)
International Fund for Agricultural Development (IFAD)
International Labour Organization (ILO)
International Maritime Organization (IMO)
International Monetary Fund (IMF)
International Olympic Committee (IOC)
International Organization for Migration (IOM)
International Red Cross and Red Crescent Movement (ICRM)
International Telecommunication Union (ITU)

International Telecommunications Satellite Organization (ITSO)
International Trade Union Confederation (ITUC)
Islamic Development Bank (IDB)
Multilateral Investment Guarantee Agency (MIGA)
Nonaligned Movement (NAM)
Organisation internationale de la Francophonie (OIF)
Organisation of Islamic Cooperation (OIC)
Organisation for the Prohibition of Chemical Weapons (OPCW)
União Latina
United Nations (UN)
United Nations Conference on Trade and Development (UNCTAD)
United Nations Educational, Scientific, and Cultural Organization (UNESCO)
United Nations Industrial Development Organization (UNIDO)
Universal Postal Union (UPU)
West African Development Bank (WADB) (regional)
West African Economic and Monetary Union (WAEMU)
World Federation of Trade Unions (WFTU)
World Health Organization (WHO)
World Intellectual Property Organization (WIPO)
World Meteorological Organization (WMO)
World Tourism Organization (UNWTO)
World Trade Organization (WTO)

Law and order in Guinea-Bissau

Law of Guinea-Bissau

 Law Enforcement in Guinea-Bissau 
Judicial Police 
National Guard 
 Constitution of Guinea-Bissau
 Human rights in Guinea-Bissau
 LGBT rights in Guinea-Bissau

Military of Guinea-Bissau

Military of Guinea-Bissau
 Command
 Commander-in-chief:
 Forces
 Army of Guinea-Bissau
 Air Force of Guinea-Bissau

Local government in Guinea-Bissau

History of Guinea-Bissau

History of Guinea-Bissau

Culture of Guinea-Bissau

Culture of Guinea-Bissau
 Cuisine of Guinea-Bissau
 Languages of Guinea-Bissau
 National symbols of Guinea-Bissau
 Coat of arms of Guinea-Bissau
 Flag of Guinea-Bissau
 National anthem of Guinea-Bissau
 Prostitution in Guinea-Bissau
 Public holidays in Guinea-Bissau
 Religion in Guinea-Bissau
 Christianity in Guinea-Bissau
 Hinduism in Guinea-Bissau
 Islam in Guinea-Bissau
 Ahmadiyya in Guinea-Bissau
 World Heritage Sites in Guinea-Bissau: None

Art in Guinea-Bissau

 Music of Guinea-Bissau

Sports in Guinea-Bissau

Sports in Guinea-Bissau
 Football in Guinea-Bissau
 Guinea-Bissau at the Olympics

Economy and infrastructure of Guinea-Bissau

Economy of Guinea-Bissau
 Economic rank, by nominal GDP (2007): 182nd (one hundred and eighty second)
 Communications in Guinea-Bissau
 Internet in Guinea-Bissau
 Companies of Guinea-Bissau
Currency of Guinea-Bissau: Franc
ISO 4217: XOF
 Health care in Guinea-Bissau
 Mining in Guinea-Bissau
 Stock Exchange in Guinea-Bissau: none – served by the regional stock exchange Bourse Régionale des Valeurs Mobilières (BRVM) in Abidjan, Côte d'Ivoire.
 Transport in Guinea-Bissau
 Airports in Guinea-Bissau
 Rail transport in Guinea-Bissau

Education in Guinea-Bissau

Education in Guinea-Bissau

See also

Index of Guinea-Bissau-related articles
List of Guinea-Bissau-related topics
List of international rankings
Member state of the United Nations
Outline of Africa
Outline of geography

References

External links

Official government website
AllAfrica news headline links
BBC News Country Profile
CIA World Factbook 
Africa South of the Sahara - Stanford University
The Index on Africa
Map of Guinea-Bissau
United States consular information sheet/travel advisory for Guinea-Bissau
Drugbarons turn Bissau into Africa's first narco-state

Mobile operators in Guinea-Bissau

Guinea-Bissau